The Androscoggin River (Abenaki: Aləssíkαntekʷ) is a river in the U.S. states of Maine and New Hampshire, in northern New England. The name "Androscoggin" comes from the Eastern Abenaki term /aləssíkɑntəkw/ or /alsíkɑntəkw/, meaning "river of cliff rock shelters" (literally "thus-deep-dwelling-river"); or perhaps from Penobscot /aləsstkɑtəkʷ/, meaning "river of rock shelters". The Anglicization of the Abenaki term is likely an analogical contamination with the colonial governor Edmund Andros.

Course

The Androscoggin begins in Errol, New Hampshire, where the Magalloway River joins the outlet of Umbagog Lake. The river flows generally south but with numerous bends past the towns of Errol and Milan and the city of Berlin before turning east at the town of Gorham, New Hampshire, to cut across the northern end of the White Mountains and enter Maine. Continuing east, the river passes the towns of Bethel, Rumford, and Dixfield before turning south at the town of Livermore Falls and leaving the mountains behind. The river passes through the twin cities of Lewiston and Auburn, turns southeast, passes the community of Lisbon Falls and reaches tidewater just below the final falls in the town of Brunswick.

Water quality
The Androscoggin was once heavily polluted by a variety of textile mills, paper mills, and other industries located along its banks, and helped inspire the Clean Water Act. The river has benefited greatly from environmental work and the departure of certain types of industry from the region. As a result, the amount of contaminated wastewater being released into the river has greatly decreased. However, several mills still release chemical waste into the river, albeit in much smaller amounts. From the 1940s through the 2000s, the Androscoggin was so polluted that some environmental groups listed it as one of the 20 most polluted rivers in the United States. The pollution became so severe that until very recently, one  stretch required oxygen bubblers to prevent fish from suffocating. As of May 2007, environmental groups had a lawsuit pending, in an attempt to force the paper mills located along the river to clean their waste streams. Most companies have agreed and generally followed through on reducing the amount of wastewater discharge, but only a few have completely stopped, with many companies citing cost as a prime factor for continued pollution.

On April 15, 2020, a large explosion occurred at the Verso Paper Mill, located on the river. It is unknown what impacts, either negative or positive, the explosion and the mill's indefinite closing will have on water quality.

Streamflow
The U.S. Geological Survey (USGS) maintains four river flow gauges on the Androscoggin River. All four are below one or more dams.

Flow here has ranged from 16,500 to 0 ft³/s (467 and 0 m³/s) (zero flow when dam closed). The mean annual flow between 1905 and 2005 is 1,919 ft³/s (54.3 m³/s).

Flow here has ranged from 21,900 to a mean daily low of 795 ft³/s (620 and 22.5 m³/s) (lows when dam closed). The mean annual flow between 1905 and 2005 is 2,512 ft³/s (71 m³/s).

Flow here has ranged from 74,000 to 625 ft³/s (2,094 and 17.7 m³/s). The mean annual flow between 1905 and 2005 is 3,801 ft³/s (107.6 m³/s).

Flow here has ranged from 135,000 to 340 ft³/s (3,820.5 and 9.6 m³/s).

Recreation

Angling

The Androscoggin River is a popular fishing destination for anglers. The upper section of the river offers good fly fishing for brook, rainbow and brown trout. Landlocked salmon can also be caught in the far northern portions of the river near Errol, New Hampshire. As the river progresses south and east of the White Mountains, the river widens some and the water quality becomes more acidic. As a result of these changes, the trout and salmon fisheries vanish almost entirely in the central and lower portions of the river. However, these sections often contain trophy smallmouth bass fisheries. Northern pike also inhabit the lower sections, with quality specimens being reported for this species as well. Other species found in the lower portions include redbreast sunfish, yellow perch, and white suckers.

Paddling

The Androscoggin River Watershed Council, a local nonprofit, has been working to establish a water trail along the entire length of the river. The trail will provide improved portages and access sites for paddling, fishing, and boating. There are currently over 40 mapped public access sites to the river.

The Androscoggin Riverlands State Park in Maine is a popular area for paddling. It consists of  along the western shoreline of the river just east of Turner.

History

The ancient name for the river was Pescedona, which is Abenaki for "a branch".

According to the USGS, variant names for the Androscoggin River include Amasagu'nteg, Amascongan, Ambrose Coggin, Ammeriscoggin, Ammoscoggin, Amos Coggin, Amoscommun, Anasagunticook, Anconganunticook, Andrews Coggin, Andros Coggan, Andros Coggin, Androscoggen, Andrus Coggin, Aumoughcaugen, and Ameriscoggin River.

The average Androscoggin drop of eight feet per mile (1.5m per km) made it an excellent source of water power encouraging development of the cities of Berlin, New Hampshire, and Lewiston and Auburn, Maine, and the Maine towns of Brunswick, Topsham, Lisbon Falls, Livermore Falls, Chisholm, Mexico, Rumford and Bethel.

Major tributaries
Listed from source to mouth of Androscoggin, with location of tributary's mouth:
 Magalloway River, Errol, New Hampshire
 Clear Stream, Errol, New Hampshire
 Mollidgewock Brook, Errol, New Hampshire
 Chickwolnepy Stream, Milan, New Hampshire
 Dead River, Berlin, New Hampshire
 Moose Brook, Gorham, New Hampshire
 Moose River, Gorham, New Hampshire
 Peabody River, Gorham, New Hampshire
 Wild River, Gilead, Maine
 Pleasant River, Bethel, Maine
 Alder River, Bethel, Maine
 Sunday River, Bethel, Maine
 Bear River, Newry, Maine
 Ellis River, Rumford, Maine
 Concord River, Rumford, Maine
 Swift River, Rumford and Mexico, Maine
 Webb River, Dixfield, Maine
 Dead River, Leeds, Maine
 Nezinscot River, Turner, Maine
 Little Androscoggin River, Auburn, Maine
 Sabattus River, Lisbon, Maine
 Little River, Lisbon Falls, Maine

References

Further reading
 McFarlane, Wallace Scot, “Defining a Nuisance: Pollution, Science, and Environmental Politics on Maine’s Androscoggin River,” Environmental History, 17 (April 2012), 307–35.

External links

 MaineRivers.org Androscoggin River profile
 Real-time flow data for the Errol, NH, Gorham, NH, Rumford, ME, and Auburn, ME gages.
 
 USGS River Basin Info
 Androscoggin River Watershed Council
 Characterization of Mercury Contamination in the Androscoggin River, Coos County, New Hampshire United States Geological Survey

 
Northern Forest Canoe Trail
Rivers of Coös County, New Hampshire
Rivers of New Hampshire
Rivers of Sagadahoc County, Maine
Rivers of Androscoggin County, Maine
Rivers of Oxford County, Maine
Rivers of Maine
Maine placenames of Native American origin
New Hampshire placenames of Native American origin